Kureyşlisarıkaya is a village in the Üzümlü District, Erzincan Province, Turkey. The village is populated by Kurds of the Alan and Lolan tribes and had a population of 63 in 2021.

The hamlets of Ahmetağa, Akören, Aydoğdu, Hasanağa, Hubar, Ilıçlı, Kazmalı, Memiliağa, Sarıca and Tekdam are attached to the village.

References 

Villages in Üzümlü District
Kurdish settlements in Erzincan Province